Harry Morris may refer to:

 Harry Morris (footballer, born 1897) (1897–1985), English football player (Swindon Town)
 Harry Morris (footballer, born 1866) (1866–1931), English football player and businessman (Small Heath / Birmingham City)
 Harry Morris, 1st Baron Morris of Kenwood (1893–1954), British Labour Party politician, Member of Parliament, 1945–1950
 Harry Morris (sportsman) (1896–1974), Australian diver and wrestler
 Harry Morris (footballer, born 1900) (1900–1964), English footballer for Crewe Alexandra, Hartlepools United and Wigan Borough

See also
 Henry Morris (disambiguation)
 Harold Morris (disambiguation)